Franc Sadleir [formerly Francis] (1775–1851) was an Irish academic and Provost of Trinity College Dublin from 1837.

Biography
Sadleir was the youngest son of Thomas Sadleir, barrister, by his first wife, Rebecca, eldest daughter of William Woodward of Clough Prior, co. Tipperary. He was educated at Trinity College Dublin, where he was elected a Scholar in 1794, and a fellow in 1805. He graduated B.A. 1795, M.A. 1805, B.D. and D.D. 1813. In 1816, 1817, and 1823 he was Donnellan lecturer at his college; from 1825 to 1835 Erasmus Smith's Professor of Mathematics, and from 1833 to 1838 Regius Professor of Greek.

In politics he was a Whig, and an advocate of Catholic emancipation. With the Duke of Leinster, the archbishop of Dublin, and others, he was one of the first commissioners for administering the funds for the education of the poor in Ireland, 1831.

In 1833 he was appointed, with the Primate, the Lord Chancellor, and other dignitaries, a commissioner to alter and amend the laws relating to the temporalities of the church of Ireland, but resigned the trust in 1837. On 22 Dec. of that year, during the viceroyalty of the Marquis of Normanby, he was made Provost of Trinity College, a post which he held for fourteen years. On more than one occasion he is said to have declined a bishopric. He upheld the principle of the Queen's colleges in Ireland.

One of the treasures of the Library at Trinity College was given to it by Sadleir in 1837. This is the 14th century manuscript known as the "Dublin Apocalypse".

Sadleir died at Castle Knock Glebe, County Dublin, on 14 December 1851, and was buried in the vaults of Trinity College on 18 December. He married Letitia, daughter of Joseph Grave of Ballycommon, King's County, by whom he left five children. There is a portrait of Sadleir in the Provost's House, Trinity College Dublin.

Publications
Sadleir published Sermons and Lectures preached in the Chapel of Trinity College, Dublin, 1821–4, 3 vols.; and National Schools for Ireland defended in a Letter to Dr. Thorpe, 1835.

References

Attribution

External links
 Dublin Apocalypse, T.C.D.

1775 births
1851 deaths
Alumni of Trinity College Dublin
Fellows of Trinity College Dublin
People from County Tipperary
Provosts of Trinity College Dublin
Scholars of Trinity College Dublin